Sar Tit Kan (also Romanized as Sar Tīt Kan) is a village in Gabrik Rural District, in the Central District of Jask County, Hormozgan Province, Iran. At the 2006 census, its population was 10, in 4 families.

References 

Populated places in Jask County